Frederick Haughton "Rangi" Thompson (31 March 1908 – 15 December 1971) was a New Zealand rower who represented his country at one Olympic and two British Empire Games, winning a medal at each.

Biography
Born in Christchurch on 31 March 1908, Thompson was the son of Ellen and Frederick Thompson. A member of the Avon Rowing Club, he began rowing in 1926.

Thompson represented New Zealand at the 1930 British Empire Games in Hamilton, Ontario. He was a member of the men's eight that won the silver medal, finishing three-quarters of a length behind the victorious English crew.

At the 1932 Summer Olympics in Los Angeles, Thompson was a member of the New Zealand crews in the men's coxless pair and the men's eight. Partnered with Cyril Stiles in the coxless pair, he progressed to the final via the repêchage, and went on to win the silver medal. They finished half a length behind the gold medal crew from Great Britain after breaking a stay on the stroke rigger 600 m from the end of the race. The New Zealand eight was eliminated in the repêchage.

Thompson again competed for New Zealand in the men's eight at the 1938 British Empire Games in Sydney, where he was a member of the bronze medal-winning crew.

Thompson worked as a tanner at the Woolston Tanneries in Christchurch, where he was involved in a serious accident in July 1943. He caught his left arm in a machine used for stripping hides, and it took 45 minutes for him to be extricated. His arm was later amputated at Christchurch Hospital. He later became a greengrocer.

Despite his accident, Thompson continued his involvement with the Avon Rowing Club, and coached David and Humphrey Gould, who won the silver medal in the coxless pair at the 1950 British Empire Games in Auckland.

Thompson died on 15 December 1971, and he was buried at Ruru Lawn Cemetery, Christchurch.

References

External links
 
 

1908 births
1971 deaths
Rowers from Christchurch
New Zealand male rowers
Olympic rowers of New Zealand
Rowers at the 1932 Summer Olympics
Olympic silver medalists for New Zealand
Rowers at the 1930 British Empire Games
Rowers at the 1938 British Empire Games
Commonwealth Games silver medallists for New Zealand
Commonwealth Games bronze medallists for New Zealand
Olympic medalists in rowing
Medalists at the 1932 Summer Olympics
Commonwealth Games medallists in rowing
New Zealand sports coaches
Rowing coaches
Burials at Ruru Lawn Cemetery
Medallists at the 1930 British Empire Games
Medallists at the 1938 British Empire Games